The 1994 Chilean telethon was 12th version of the solidarity campaign conducted in Chile, which took place on the 2nd. and 3 December 1994. The theme of this edition was "Chile's Commitment." The poster boy was Loreto Manzanero. This version was performed 2 years after the previous because in December 1993 parliamentary and presidential elections took place. This was the first telethon to be held during the government of Eduardo Frei Ruiz-Tagle.

The official collection for this campaign was CL$3,640,268,169.

After the final total and a brief interview by Don Francisco of Jane Hermocillas and Valeria Arias, the first two poster girls, to finish the program, artists sang some of the official songs from previous telethons, finishing with all the public entertainers, poster boys and girls and children singing the "Ode to Joy".

Totals

Sponsors

Artists

National singers 
  Illapu
  Keko Yungue
  Sexual Democracia
  Parkinson
  Patricio Renán
  Danny Chilean
  Susy Becky
  Los Tigres
  Beatlemanía
  Cecilia
  Maritza
  Carlos González
   Paolo Salvatore
  Los Hermanos Bustos
  Eliseo Guevara
  Pachuco y la Cubanacán
  El Huaso Clavel
  Los Chacareros de Paine
  El Monteaguilino
  Cecilia Echeñique
  Sonora Palacios
  Andrea Labarca
  Fernando Casas
  René Inostroza
  Zalo Reyes
  Álvaro Scaramelli
  Los Huasos Quincheros
  La Sociedad
  Fernando Ubiergo
  Alberto Plaza
    Roberto Vander
  Sergio Lillo
  José Alfredo Fuentes
  Wildo
  Gloria Benavides
  Congreso
  Luis Jara

International singers 
  Christina y Los Subterráneos
  Los Temerarios
  Los Calzones Rotos
  Technotronic
  Majo & Co.
  Laura Pausini
  Aleks Syntek y la Gente Normal
  Wilfrido Vargas
  Los Kofre
  Azúcar Moreno
  Proyecto Uno
  Carolina con K
   Ricardo Montaner

Comedians 
 José Luis Giogia
 Dino Gordillo
 Daniel Vilches
 Eduardo Thompson
 Guillermo Bruce
 Pepe Tapia
 Bombo Fica
 La Cuatro Dientes
 Pinto, Paredes y Angulo
 Los Indolatinos
 Palta Melendez
 Álvaro Salas

Magazine 
 Bafochi
 Bafona
 Alexandra and her Ballet
 Albert Lucas, juggler
 Martin Lunas
 El Mago Robot
 Raul Di Blasio

Children's section 
 Cachureos
 Pipiripao
 Disney Club

Adult's section 
 Tatiana Merino
 Sandra Callejón
 Paola Volpe

Transmission 
 Telenorte
 La Red
 UCV Televisión
 Televisión Nacional de Chile
 Megavisión
 Chilevisión Red de Televisión Universidad de Chile
 Universidad Católica de Chile Televisión
 Red Metrópolis Televisión por Cable
 Red TV Cable Intercom
 Red VTR TV Cable-Cablexpress

References

External links
 1994 Chilean telethon - Closing (1st part)
 1994 Chilean telethon - Summary
 1994 Chilean telethon - Closing (2nd part)
 1994 Chilean telethon - Banco de Chile's Advertising

Telethon
Chilean telethons